Nuagaon railway station is a railway station on the South Eastern Railway network in the state of Odisha, India. It serves Nuagaon village. Its code is NXN. It has two platforms. Passenger, Express trains halt at Nuagaon railway station.

Major Trains

 Dhanbad - Alappuzha Express
 Sambalpur - Manduadih Express
 Tapaswini Express

References

See also
 Sundergarh district

Railway stations in Sundergarh district
Chakradharpur railway division